Heliophorus is a genus of lycaenid butterflies.

Selected species
 Heliophorus androcles
 Heliophorus bakeri
 Heliophorus brahma
 Heliophorus epicles
 Heliophorus hybrida
 Heliophorus kohimensis
 Heliophorus oda
 Heliophorus saphir
 Heliophorus sena
 Heliophorus tamu

References

 
Lycaenidae genera
Lycaeninae
Taxa named by Carl Geyer